SS Nidd was a freight vessel built for the Goole Steam Shipping Company in 1900.

History

She was built in 1900 by the Cylde Shipbuilding Company Port Glasgow as one of a trio of ships which included SS Colne and SS Humber, both built in 1903, for the Goole Steam Shipping Company.  As well as the capacity for 1,300 tons of cargo she had provision for carrying 100 horses as deck cargo. She was launched on 30 July 1900 and arrived in Goole on 31 August 1900.

In 1905 she came under the ownership of the Lancashire and Yorkshire Railway. On 23 January 1913 in the River Humber the Wilson liner Argyll collided with Nidd, which was lying at anchor.

Nidd returned to her owners′ Antwerp service in 1919. In 1922 she was taken over by the London and North Western Railway, and in 1923 the London, Midland and Scottish Railway. Towards the end of her career in 1932 she was chartered to the Great Western Railway for the Weymouth-to-Jersey trade. On 28 August 1933 she arrived in Mostyn for scrapping.

References

1900 ships
Steamships of the United Kingdom
Ships built on the River Tyne
Ships of the Lancashire and Yorkshire Railway
Ships of the London and North Western Railway
Ships of the London, Midland and Scottish Railway
Maritime incidents in 1918